Victoria Graiver (born 19 September 1989) is an Argentine-born Israeli footballer and futsal player who plays as a midfielder for Liga Neumit club Hapoel Ironi Petah Tikva.

An Argentine Jew, Graiver represented Argentina at the 2013 Maccabiah Games. After that, she stayed in Israel, where she started a professional career and played once for its women's national team in 2016.

International career
Graiver made her senior debut for Israel on 21 January 2016 in a 0–0 friendly draw against Ukraine.

References

External links
Victoria Graiver — Israeli Football Association national team player details 

1989 births
Living people
Israeli women's footballers
Israel women's international footballers
Women's association football midfielders
F.C. Ramat HaSharon players
ASA Tel Aviv University players
Hapoel Petah Tikva F.C. (women) players
Jewish Israeli sportspeople
Israeli people of Argentine-Jewish descent
Sportspeople of Argentine descent
Argentine women's footballers
Maccabiah Games footballers
Maccabiah Games competitors for Argentina
Competitors at the 2013 Maccabiah Games
Argentine women's futsal players
Footballers from Buenos Aires
Jewish Argentine sportspeople
Argentine emigrants to Israel
Israeli Jews